M.L. Chartier (July 15, 1930–June 23, 2006) was born in St. Clair County, Michigan. He was inducted into the NCHA NonPro Hall of Fame (1980), and showed cutting horses in both the National Cutting Horse Association (NCHA) and the American Quarter Horse Association (AQHA) sponsored events. He was also the owner of NCHA Horse Hall of Fame cutting horse stallion Dry Doc. Chartier is the father of current champion Randy Chartier and the grandfather of champion R.L. Chartier.

References

NCHA Hall of Fame (riders)
2006 deaths
1930 births